Eggs 'n' brains is a breakfast meal consisting of pork brains (or those of another mammal) and scrambled eggs. It is a dish of Portuguese cuisine known as Omolete de Mioleira. In Austria, the dish is known as Hirn mit Ei ("calf's brain with eggs") and used to be very common, but has seen a sharp drop in popularity.

In the United States
In the American Midwest, the names are reversed and it is called "brains and eggs". It is also a breakfast dish in the cuisine of the Southern United States and has also been served as a lunch dish.

See also

Fried-brain sandwich
 List of egg dishes

References

External links
Breakfast "Brains N' Eggs" recipe

Egg dishes
Brain dishes
Food combinations